2015 Bamako shooting could mean:

 the March 2015 Bamako shooting
 the November 2015 Bamako hotel attack